Murdocksville is an unincorporated community in Allegheny County, in the U.S. state of Pennsylvania.

History
The community was named for James Murdock, an early settler.

References

Unincorporated communities in Allegheny County, Pennsylvania
Unincorporated communities in Pennsylvania